A fire shelter is a safety device of last resort used by wildland firefighters when trapped by wildfires. While such a shelter cannot withstand sustained contact with flames, it can protect a firefighter's life in a short-lived grass fire. Furthermore, it is designed to reflect radiant heat, protect against convective heat, and trap breathable air — most firefighters' deaths are from inhaling hot gases — so that firefighters can survive in non-burning areas surrounded by intense fire for more than an hour.

First required in the United States in 1977, fire shelters are constructed layers of aluminum foil, woven silica, and fiberglass. When deployed, its maximum dimensions are 86 in. x 15.5 in. x 31 in. (approximately 218.44 cm x 39.37 cm x 78.74 cm) and has a shape like a mound. When the shelter is packed into its carrying case, its dimensions are 8.5 in. x 5.5 in. x 4 in. (approximately 21.6 cm x 14 cm x 10 cm). The new-generation fire shelter was developed in 2002 to replace the old style fire shelter which is shaped like a pup-tent and has a carrying case.

The first known use of a fire shelter was in 1804, when a boy was saved from a prairie fire when his mother covered him with a fresh bison hide.  William Clark noted in his journal that the fire did not burn the grass around the boy. In the United States fire shelters began being used by wildland firefighters during the late 1960s and have proven extremely effective. In more than 1,200 uses through 2013 only 41 deaths had occurred.

See also
Beta cloth

References 

Safety equipment
Wildfire suppression equipment